Sikukia longibarbata is a cyprinid of the genus Sikukia. It inhabits China and is considered harmless to humans.

References

Cyprinid fish of Asia
Freshwater fish of China